The 1988 Volvo Tennis Los Angeles was a men's tennis tournament played on outdoor hard courts at the Los Angeles Tennis Center in Los Angeles, California in the United States that was part of the 1988 Nabisco Grand Prix. It was the 62nd edition of the tournament and was held from September 19 through September 25, 1988. Fourth-seeded Mikael Pernfors won the singles title and earned $59,500 first-prize money.

Finals

Singles

 Mikael Pernfors defeated  Andre Agassi 6–2, 7–5
 It was Pernfors' first singles title of his career.

Doubles

 John McEnroe /  Mark Woodforde defeated  Peter Doohan /  Jim Grabb 6–4, 6–4

References

External links
 ITF tournament edition details

Countrywide Classic
Volvo Tennis Los Angeles
Volvo Tennis Los Angeles
Volvo Tennis Los Angeles
Volvo Tennis Los Angeles